The Pleurotaceae are a family of small to medium-sized mushrooms which have white spores.  The family contains four genera (Nematoctonus has been synonymized with Hohenbuehelia, but not all of its species have been moved to valid genera) and 94 species. Members of Pleurotaceae can be mistaken for members of Marasmiaceae. Perhaps the best known member is the oyster mushroom, Pleurotus ostreatus.

Many species in the genera Pleurotus and Hohenbuehelia are nematophagous, that is, they derive nutrition by consuming nematodes. This is made possible by hyphae that may have adhesive knobs that attach to passing nematodes and secrete nematotoxic compounds.

See also
List of Agaricales families

References

External links

 
Agaricales families

ar:محارية